The Lach dialects, also known as Lachian dialects, are a group of West Slavic dialects that form a transition between the Polish and Czech language. They are spoken in parts of Czech Silesia, the Hlučín Region, and northeastern Moravia, as well as in some adjacent villages in Poland. Most Czech researchers consider Lach a dialect of Czech, whereas Polish dialectologists tend to ascribe Polish origins to Lach.

Lachian is divided into numerous subdialects (Western, Eastern and Southern), it can therefore also be regarded as a dialect continuum, with limited mutual intelligibility between the eastern and western dialects. This dialectal differentiation is not typical for the Czech Republic, where there is a good deal of dialect leveling, especially in the west of the republic.

Most Lachs, especially younger speakers, now speak standard Czech, and use it as a written language, while Lach remains the language of everyday speech. Lachian contains many German loanwords, according to some sources, up to 8% of the vocabulary.

The poet Óndra Łysohorsky is probably the best-known writer in a Lachian dialect. Łysohorsky was notable for refusing to write in Standard Czech, instead writing in the local dialect of Upper Silesia.  In doing so, he contributed significantly to the development of the Lach literary language.

Example text

See also 

 Cieszyn Silesian dialect
 Lachian Dances
 Silesian language
 Sulkovian dialect

Footnotes

References 
 

Czech dialects
Polish dialects
Languages of the Czech Republic
Languages of Poland